The 1996–97 Moldovan Cup was the sixth season of the Moldovan annual football cup competition. The competition ended with the final held on 14 May 1997.

Round of 32

|}

Round of 16

|}

Quarter-finals
The first legs were played on 9 March 1997. The second legs were played on 2 April 1997.

|}

Semi-finals
The first legs were played on 16 April 1997. The second legs were played on 30 April 1997.

|}

Final

References
 

Moldovan Cup seasons
Moldovan Cup
Moldova